WBZQ is an AM radio station located in Huntington, Indiana. The station operates on the AM radio frequency of 1300 kHz. WBZQ was owned by Larko Communications until 2012, when the station was sold to Fifty Seven Media, LLC, following the death of owner Christopher Larko in 2010.

Programming
Currently, it is silent, but last broadcast Spanish language programming. Previously, the station had an Oldies format.

References

External links

BZQ